Shweta Shetty (also known as Shwetaa in nickname) is an Indian pop singer known for her albums and for her contributions to Bollywood film soundtracks. Her most remix hit song is "Q-Funk" from the album Oorja in 1995.

Life and career
Shetty's album, Johnny Joker, was a success. She was awarded the Best Female Pop Artist for her work in the album Deewane To Deewane Hain at the 1998 Screen Awards.

In 1997, Shetty married a German man, Clemens Brandt, and moved to Hamburg. They divorced five years later, but it wasn't until 2015 when Shetty eventually moved back to India. 

She is cousin of Indian actresses Shilpa Shetty and Shamita Shetty.

Shetty launched a brand new single Daro Na feat. Delhi based Music Producer Addy S during the pandemic which was shot and edited at home while in lockdown.

In 2021, Shetty launched a remix of original song jalne mein hai mazza (1993) by salim-suleman with House music producer Addy S on Sony music India. the video was shot in goa and was very well received by the audience and critics alike as a 90s disco revivalist number.

Discography

Studio albums

Soundtracks
 "Rukmani Rukmani" from Roja (1992)
 "Mangta Hai Kya" from Rangeela (1995)
 "Kaale Kaale Baal" from Ziddi (1997)
 "Main Deewani Main Mastani" from Bandhan (1998)
 "Tote Tote Ho Gaya" from Bichhoo (2000)
 "Lambo" from cancelled video game Lamborghini (2003)

Singles
''Daro Na feat. Addy S (2020)
 Jalne Mein Hain Mazaa (Addy S Version) ( 2021)

Collaborations
Gayatri Mantra (Celestial Yoga Version) by Shweta Shetty, Mihir Chandan, Madoc, C-Deep (2022)
Gayatri Mantra (Acoustic Version) by Shweta Shetty, Mihir Chandan, Madoc, C-Deep (2022)

References

Shweta and Addy S youtube Channel 

Indipop-queen-shweta-shetty-is-back-with-a-house-infused-covid-anthem-daro-na with Addy S

indie-pop-queen-shweta-shetty-is-back-with-a-new-music-video with Addy S

shweta-shetty-is-back-with-her-own-youtube-channel

Year of birth missing (living people)
Indian women singer-songwriters
Indian women pop singers
Living people
21st-century Indian women singers
21st-century Indian singers
Place of birth missing (living people)